Mangaļsala is a neighbourhood of Northern District in Riga, the capital of Latvia. It is located on the right bank of Daugava River, on the coast of the Gulf of Riga.

External links

 

Neighbourhoods in Riga